Great House, Llanarth, Monmouthshire is a farmhouse dating from the late-16th century. Extended in the mid-17th century and little altered thereafter, it is a Grade II* listed building. The detached barn range has its own Grade II listing.

History
The architectural historian John Newman dates the original house to the late 16th century. Sir Cyril Fox and Lord Raglan, in their three-volume study, Monmouthshire Houses, note that the original house, of a two-room plan which Cadw dates to 1580, was extended c.1620 to create a parlour. The house was again extended and modernised "before (Fox and Raglan's inspection in) 1942". In a tithe map of 1845, the house, together with 127 acres, is recorded as part of Sir Samuel Fludyer's Trostrey Court estate and was being farmed by a William Griffiths. Now part of the Pontypool Park Estate, the farm remains privately-owned.

Architecture and description
Constructed of white washed rubble, and of two storeys with attics, the house has a substantial stair-turret to its western end. Fox and Raglan note that the staircase wing had, until the Second World War, "a complete set of door frames which added to the dignity of the house". The house has a Grade II* listing, Cadw's record describing it as "an impressively intact farmhouse". The barn and stable block facing Great House, date from the 18th and 19th centuries respectively, and has its own Grade II listing.

Notes

Sources
 
 

Buildings and structures in Monmouthshire
Grade II* listed buildings in Monmouthshire